Sergei Vladimirovich Maitakov (born 7 January 1990 in Mezhdurechensk, Kemerovo Oblast) is a  Russian  olympic alpine skier.

External links 
 
 

1990 births
Living people
People from Mezhdurechensk, Kemerovo Oblast
Russian male alpine skiers
Alpine skiers at the 2010 Winter Olympics
Alpine skiers at the 2014 Winter Olympics
Olympic alpine skiers of Russia
Sportspeople from Kemerovo Oblast